Kyler Alexander Edwards (born May 3, 1999) is an American professional basketball player for the Motor City Cruise of the NBA G League. He played college basketball for the Texas Tech Red Raiders and the Houston Cougars.

High school career
Edwards began his high school career at Bowie High School. He played alongside Cade Cunningham. As a junior, he averaged 22.4 points, six rebounds and 3.1 assists per game and was named District 4-6A Offensive Player of the Year. For his senior season, Edwards transferred to Findlay Prep to play for coach Rodney Haddix. He averaged 16.4 points, 5.2 rebounds and 4.2 assists per game. Considered a three-star recruit, Edwards committed to playing college basketball for Texas Tech over offers from Butler, Georgia Tech, Houston, Iowa State, Kansas State, LSU, Missouri, Nebraska, Oklahoma State, USC and Virginia Tech.

College career
In the 2019 NCAA Division I Men's Basketball Championship Game, Edwards scored 12 points and had three rebounds in the loss to Virginia. As a freshman, he averaged 5.5 points, 2.2 rebounds and 1.1 assists per game. On January 20, 2020, Edwards was named Big 12 player of the week after posting 24 points against Kansas State and 22 points in the Red Raiders' home win over Iowa State. He averaged 11.4 points, four rebounds, and 3.1 assists per game as a sophomore. As a junior, Edwards averaged 10.1 points, 4.8 rebounds, and 2.8 assists per game, shooting 41.8 percent from three-point range. He was a Big 12 honorable mention selection. Following the season he opted to transfer to Houston, picking the Cougars over LSU and Texas. On January 15, 2022, Edwards scored a career-high 29 points including seven three-pointers in a 66–64 win against Tulsa. He was named to the Second Team All-AAC.

Professional career

Motor City Cruise (2022–present)
On November 3, 2022, Edwards was named to the opening night roster for the Motor City Cruise.

Career statistics

College

|-
| style="text-align:left;"| 2018–19
| style="text-align:left;"| Texas Tech
| 38 || 0 || 17.8 || .413 || .449 || .660 || 2.2 || 1.1 || .6 || .2 || 5.5
|-
| style="text-align:left;"| 2019–20
| style="text-align:left;"| Texas Tech
| 31 || 31 || 33.4 || .404 || .322 || .773 || 4.0 || 3.1 || .9 || .5 || 11.4
|-
| style="text-align:left;"| 2020–21
| style="text-align:left;"| Texas Tech
| 29 || 26 || 31.2 || .408 || .418 || .789 || 4.8 || 2.8 || 1.1 || .5 || 10.1
|-
| style="text-align:left;"| 2021–22
| style="text-align:left;"| Houston
| 37 || 37 || 34.1 || .369 || .333 || .697 || 5.9 || 3.2 || 1.0 || .4 || 13.8
|- class="sortbottom"
| style="text-align:center;" colspan="2"| Career
|| 135 || 94 || 28.7 || .393 || .361 || .729 || 4.2 || 2.5 || .9 || .4 || 10.1

Personal life
Edwards is the son of Lori Alexander and Kelvin Edwards. His father played football for the Dallas Cowboys in the 1980s.

References

External links
Houston Cougars bio
Texas Tech Red Raiders bio

1999 births
Living people
American men's basketball players
Basketball players from Texas
Findlay Prep alumni
Houston Cougars men's basketball players
Shooting guards
Sportspeople from Arlington, Texas
Texas Tech Red Raiders basketball players